Gary Louis Rajsich (born October 28, 1954) is an American Major League Baseball (MLB) scout and a former professional baseball outfielder. He played all or parts of four seasons in the Majors from  until , then played three additional seasons for the Chunichi Dragons from  until . He was the Baltimore Orioles' director of amateur scouting from November 28, 2011, until the conclusion of the 2018 season.

He also has scouted for the Boston Red Sox (1994–2006), Texas Rangers (2007–2009), and Toronto Blue Jays (2010–2011).

References

External links

Pura Pelota (Venezuelan League)
Retrosheet

1954 births
Living people
American expatriate baseball players in Japan
American people of Serbian descent
Atlanta Braves scouts
Baltimore Orioles scouts
Baseball players from Youngstown, Ohio
Boston Red Sox scouts
Charleston Charlies players
Chunichi Dragons players
Cocoa Astros players
Columbus Astros players
Covington Astros players
Louisville Redbirds players
Major League Baseball outfielders
New York Mets players
Phoenix Giants players
San Francisco Giants players
St. Louis Cardinals players
St. Petersburg Pelicans players
Texas Rangers scouts
Tiburones de La Guaira players
American expatriate baseball players in Venezuela
Tidewater Tides players
Toronto Blue Jays scouts
Tucson Toros players
Alaska Goldpanners of Fairbanks players